The 1904 Washington & Jefferson football team was an American football team that represented Washington & Jefferson College as an independent during the 1904 college football season.  Led by third-year head coach William B. Seaman, the team compiled a record of 5–3–1.

Schedule

References

Washington and Jefferson
Washington & Jefferson Presidents football seasons
Washington and Jefferson Red and Black football